The American Begonia Society is a horticultural society devoted to the promotion, cultivation, and study of begonias (plant family Begoniaceae).  The organization was founded in 1932, and has a worldwide membership.  It is the International Cultivar Registration Authority for begonias.

The organization publishes a bi-monthly magazine, The Begonian.

Mission
The stated aims and purposes of the ABS are:

 To stimulate and promote interest in begonias and other shade-loving plants.
 To encourage the introduction and development of new types of these plants.
 To standardize the nomenclature of begonias.
 To gather and publish information in regard to kinds, propagation, and culture of begonias and companion plants
 To issue a bulletin that will be mailed to all members of the society.
 To bring into friendly contact all who love and grow begonias.

References

External links
 American Begonia Society website

Horticultural organizations based in the United States
Nonprofit hobbyist organizations based in the United States